James Kemsey Wilkinson (December 1906 – December 1997) was an English businessman, the founder of the high street chain Wilko. In 2014, it was reported that Wilko had 372 stores, 23,000 employees and annual revenues of £1.5 billion.

Early life
James Kemsey Wilkinson was born on 6 December 1906.

Career
Together with his fiancée, Mary Cooper, he founded Wilkinson Cash Stores in Leicester in 1930, opening their first store there at 151 Charnwood Street. His brother Donald already had a hardware store in Birmingham, and two of his stores in Handsworth later joined the chain. In 1932, they opened their second store, in Wigston.

In 1937, his brother John joined as a director.

He ceased to be a director of Wilko on 18 December 1997 when he died.

He was interred at Sileby Cemetery, Leicestershire

The company remains in the ownership of his family.

Personal life
He married Mary Cooper on 22 October 1934 at St Peter's, Highfields, Leicester at 8am, and they were both back in the shop by 11am.

Their son, Tony Wilkinson was born in 1937.

References

1906 births
1997 deaths
British retail company founders
People from Leicester
20th-century English businesspeople